Jersey French may refer to:

Jersey Legal French
Jèrriais